Mats Bergmans is a dansband from Nyköping, Sweden, established in 1973 as Sjösa kustband, before a naming dispute made them change name to Sjösagrabbarna. The band became a full-time band in 1981, and changed name to Mats Bergmans in 1987.

Members
 Linus Lindholm - Vocals
 Magnus Nyman – Bass, saxophone, Kapellmeister
 Mikael Eriksson - Guitar
 Torbjörn Kempe - Drums
 Gullmar Bergman - Keyboard

Former members 
 Jonas Näslund - Vocals (1995-2008)
 Urban Ljungqvist - Saxophone

Discography

Albums 
 1989 - Live i Folkets Park
 1990 - Live i Folkets Park
 1991 - Mats Bergmans
 1992 - Mats Bergmans
 1997 - 100% chans
 1999 - Mest önskade - Live
 2000 - Mest önskade 2
 2002 - Min egen ängel
 2004 - Vänd dig inte om
 2006 - Den stora dagen
 2007 - Kalifornien
 2007 - Jubileum
 2009 - Premiär
 2011 - Det kommer från hjärtat

Singles 
 1999 - Säg som det är
 1999 - Alla världens rosor

Svensktoppen songs 
 Har du tid med kärleken - 2000
 Lika kära nu som då - 2001-2002
 Min egen ängel - 2002
 Kan du hålla dom orden? - 2006
 En lycklig man - 2008

References

External links 
 Official website

Dansbands
Musical groups established in 1973
1973 establishments in Sweden
Culture in Nyköping